Ballpark station may refer to:
 Ballpark station (UTA), a light rail station in Salt Lake City, Utah
 Richmond County Bank Ballpark station, a former railroad station in Staten Island, New York, sometimes referred to as "Ballpark"

See also
 Ballpark (disambiguation)